The Christian Medical & Dental Associations (CMDA) is made up of the Christian Medical Association and the Christian Dental Association. As of 2018, CMDA had over 19,000 members. It is the United States affiliate of the International Christian Medical & Dental Associations.

The membership consists of physicians, dentists, and other allied health professionals. CMDA "sponsors overseas medical mission projects, provides members with a network for fellowship and professional growth, finances student campus ministries in medical and dental schools, publishes educational/inspirational materials, hosts marriage and family conferences, offers continuing education for missionary doctors, and develops overseas academic exchange programs". In addition, "Christian Medical & Dental Associations (CMDA) works on 270 medical/dental school campuses with over five thousand students."

Members of the Christian Medical & Dental Associations are from various political and religious movements, such as evangelicalism, in addition to several Christian denominations including Baptists, Anglicans, Lutherans, Catholics, Methodists, Presbyterians and Orthodox.

Public Policy
The Christian Medical Association's Washington office provides a national voice for members on public policy issues such as health care, conscience rights, human trafficking, international health, abortion, HIV-AIDS, sexual orientation/gender identity, human cloning, abstinence, stem cell research, assisted suicide, among other issues.

The Washington office links members with Congress, the White House, federal agencies and policy organizations; provides congressional testimony; presents pro-life perspectives through the national media; and publishes resources on vital issues.

The Washington office also directs the Freedom2Care (www.Freedom2Care.org) coalition of over 50 organizations to advance conscience rights in health care.

See also

American Scientific Affiliation (US)
Christian Legal Society (US)
Christian Medical and Dental Fellowship of Australia (Oceania)
Christian Medical Association of India (Hindustan)
Christian Medical and Dental Society (Canada)
Christian Medical Fellowship (UK)
Christians in Science (UK)
Society of Ordained Scientists (International)
The BioLogos Foundation (International) 
The Veritas Forum (International)

References

External links
CMDA
International Christian Medical and Dental Association (ICMDA)

Evangelical parachurch organizations
Dental organizations based in the United States
Medical associations based in the United States
Medical and health organizations based in Tennessee
1931 establishments in the United States
Anti-abortion organizations in the United States